The Croatian Rugby Federation is the governing body for rugby union in Croatia.

Teams

Men
Croatia - the national men's rugby union team.
7s - the national men's rugby union seven-a-side team.

See also
Croatia national rugby union team
Rugby union in Croatia

External links
  Croatian Rugby Federation - Official Site

Rugby union in Croatia
Croatia
Sports organizations established in 1962